The 1975 Virginia Slims of Detroit  was a women's tennis tournament played on indoor carpet courts at the Cobo Hall & Arena  in Detroit, Michigan in the United States that was part of the 1975 Virginia Slims World Championship Series. It was the fourth edition of the tournament and was held from February 18 through February 22, 1975. First-seeded Evonne Goolagong won the singles title and earned $15,000 first-prize money.

Finals

Singles
 Evonne Goolagong defeated  Margaret Court 6–3, 3–6, 6–3
 It was Goolagong's 2nd singles title of the year and the 60th of her career.

Doubles
 Lesley Hunt /  Martina Navratilova defeated  Françoise Dürr /  Betty Stöve 2–6, 7–5, 6–2

Prize money

References

Virginia Slims of Detroit
Virginia Slims of Detroit
1975 in sports in Michigan
February 1975 sports events in the United States